The Kano air disaster was a chartered Boeing 707 passenger flight on 22 January 1973 that crashed while attempting to land at Kano International Airport.  It is the deadliest aviation disaster ever to take place in Nigeria, as 176 passengers and crew perished in the crash. There were 26 survivors.

Aircraft 
The aircraft involved in the accident was a 2 year old Boeing 707-3D3C, JY-ADO, owned by Alia Royal Jordanian Airlines, operating on behalf of Nigeria Airways. It first flew in 1971 and was powered by 4 Pratt and Whitney JT3D engines. It had a manufacturer serial number (MSN) of 850.

Flight

The Boeing 707, operated by Alia, had been chartered by Nigeria Airways to fly pilgrims back from Jeddah, Saudi Arabia to Lagos, Nigeria. Bad weather at Lagos caused the crew to divert to Kano. Kano International Airport was experiencing high winds at the time. The aircraft landed nose wheel first, and the nose wheel collapsed after hitting a depression in the runway. The right main landing gear leg subsequently collapsed. The 707 turned 180 degrees, excursed from the runway and burst into flames.

Of the 202 passengers and crew on board, 176 died. At the time of its occurrence, the Kano air disaster was the deadliest civil aviation accident, a distinction it only held for about 14 months when Turkish Airlines Flight 981 crashed in France and killed 346 people, becoming the overall deadliest aviation disaster (after also surpassing the 1968 Kham Duc C-130 shootdown which claimed 189 lives). It was also the deadliest aviation disaster involving a Boeing 707 at the time until another Alia Royal Jordanian plane crashed in Morocco two years later.

References

Airliner accidents and incidents caused by weather
Aviation accidents and incidents in 1973
Accidents and incidents involving the Boeing 707
Aviation accidents and incidents in Nigeria
Royal Jordanian accidents and incidents
Nigeria Airways accidents and incidents
1973 meteorology
January 1973 events in Africa